The British Animation Film Festival (BAFF) is a one-day animation festival founded in 2012 that takes place annually in London's West End. The festival aims to highlight the best in British, independent and International animated films.

The festival co-ordinator is Jessica Pearce and is one of four festivals hosted by the Film Festival Guild. The British Animation Film Festival has taken place annually in London at such venues as the Rich Mix Cinema, Empire, Leicester Square, Roxy Bar & Screen, Cineworld, Leicester Square & the Close-Up Cinema. The British Animation Film Festival was also hosted online in 2020 and 2021 due to the COVID-19 pandemic.

Awards
The British Animation Film Festival host an array of award categories including:
 Best Animated Feature 
 Best Animated Short 
 Best 2D Animation
 Best 3D Animation
 Best Sound Effects/Design
 Best Music 
 Best Music Video 
 Best Student Film 
 Best TV Episode
 The Lotte Reiniger Award
 The Rising Star Award
 Best Unproduced/New Screenplay

2012 BAFF Official Selection & Award Winners

2013 BAFF Official Selection & Award Winners

2014 BAFF Official Selection & Award Winners

2015 BAFF Official Selection & Award Winners

2016 BAFF Official Selection & Award Winners

2017 BAFF Official Selection & Award Winners

2018 BAFF Official Selection & Award Winners

2019 BAFF Official Selection & Award Winners

2020 BAFF Official Selection & Award Winners

2021 BAFF Official Selection & Award Winners

2022 BAFF Official Selection & Award Winners

See also
 BFI London Film Festival
 London Independent Film Festival
 London International Animation Festival
 London Short Film Festival
 UK Film Festival

References

External links
 Official site Retrieved 12 March 2019
 BAFF at Film Freeway Retrieved 15 March 2019

Film festivals in London